The 2004 1000 km of Nürburgring was the second round of the 2004 Le Mans Series season, held at the Nürburgring, Germany.  It was run on July 4, 2004.

Official results

Class winners in bold.  Cars failing to complete 70% of winner's distance marked as Not Classified (NC).

† – #36 Gerard Welter was disqualified in post-race inspection for having an illegal airbox fitted to the car.

Statistics
 Pole Position – #3 Creation Autosportif – 1:46.681
 Average Speed – 153.877 km/h

External links
 World Sports Racing Prototypes – 2004 1000 km of Nürburgring results

N
6 Hours of Nürburgring
Nurburgring 1000